Jason Lee Dunham (November 10, 1981 – April 22, 2004) was a corporal in the United States Marine Corps who was posthumously awarded the Medal of Honor for his actions while serving with 3rd Battalion 7th Marines during the Iraq War. While on a patrol in Husaybah, his unit was attacked and he deliberately covered an enemy grenade to save nearby Marines. When it exploded Dunham was gravely injured and died eight days later.

Early life and education
Jason Dunham was born on November 10, 1981, in Scio, New York, and resided there with his parents, Dan and Deb, and his three siblings, two brothers and a sister. He graduated from Scio High School in 2000, having played basketball for his high school team.

Military service

Dunham joined the United States Marine Corps in 2000. After graduating from recruit training on October 27 from Golf Company Platoon 2092, he served as a Security Force sentry at Naval Submarine Base Kings Bay in Georgia until 2003.

In early 2004, Dunham was serving as a squad leader with 4th Platoon, Company K, 3rd Battalion, 7th Marine Regiment, 1st Marine Division, I Marine Expeditionary Force. His unit was based in Al-Karābilah.

On April 14, 2004, the battalion commander's convoy came under attack near Husaybah, Iraq, and 4th Platoon was dispatched on patrol to investigate. Dunham and his squad intercepted a number of cars spotted near the scene of the attack, which the patrol detained to search for weapons. When the squad approached a white Toyota Land Cruiser and discovered AK-47s, the driver exited and attacked the Marines in an attempt to flee. Dunham responded by closing in for hand-to-hand combat to subdue him. During the fighting, the individual dropped an armed Mills 36M hand grenade.

Dunham, to save the rest of his men, deliberately threw himself on the grenade, attempting to use his PASGT helmet to shield himself and others from the explosion, warning the others to "watch his hands." Dunham, the insurgent, and two other Marines nearby were all wounded by grenade fragments.

Dunham was severely wounded by the grenade blast, and was immediately evacuated. Within days, he arrived at National Naval Medical Center in Bethesda, Maryland, in a coma, where he was being treated for his injuries. After being diagnosed with brain damage and deemed unlikely to recover, he was taken off life support eight days later, on April 22, 2004. Shortly beforehand, Commandant of the Marine Corps, General Michael Hagee, presented Dunham with the Purple Heart. Dunham's parents were at his bedside when he died. He was buried in Fairlawn Cemetery in Scio, Allegany County, New York.

In 2004, Michael M. Phillips, staff writer for The Wall Street Journal, wrote an article summarizing Dunham's actions that appeared on page A1 of the May 25 edition. In 2005, Phillips published The Gift of Valor: A War Story, which told Dunham's life story.

Honors and awards

In addition to the Medal of Honor and his other military decorations, Dunham has also received other honors:
  
 The United States Post Office in Scio, New York was renamed the Corporal Jason L. Dunham Post Office
 The Marine Corps Security Force Barracks at Naval Submarine Base Kings Bay Georgia was renamed the Corporal Jason Dunham Barracks
 Crucible warrior's station at both Marine Corps Recruit Depot Parris Island, South Carolina and at San Diego, California, are named in his honor
 The Marine Corps League Chapter in Palm Desert, California is named in his honor. 
 The Cpl Dunham Room, Corporals Course, Marine Corps Air Station Beaufort, South Carolina. 
 A chapter of the Leathernecks Motorcycle Club International is named in his honor.
 Dunham Hall is a Marine Corps dining facility named after Cpl Jason Dunham on Marine Corps Air Ground Combat Center in Twentynine Palms.

Military decorations
Dunham's awards include:

Medal of Honor
Shortly after his death, Lieutenant Colonel Matthew Lopez, Dunham's commanding officer, began the process of nominating him for the Medal of Honor, the United States' highest award for valor in combat. On November 10, 2006, at the dedication of the National Museum of the Marine Corps, President George W. Bush announced that Corporal Dunham would receive the Medal of Honor, making him the second recipient of the Medal of Honor for actions in the Iraq War and the first Marine recipient for actions since the Vietnam War.

President Bush presented Dunham's family with the Medal of Honor in a ceremony in the East Room of the White House on January 11, 2007.

Citation

For service as set forth in the following citation:

USS Jason Dunham

On March 20, 2007, the Navy reported that a new  guided missile destroyer would be named , in his honor. In a formal ceremony in Scio on March 23, 2007, Navy Secretary Donald C. Winter officially announced the naming of DDG-109 after Dunham. The keel was laid at a ceremony on April 11, 2008, at Bath Iron Works in Bath, Maine. The ship was christened on August 1, 2009, with Dunham's mother Debra acting as the ship's sponsor.

Among family members and officials present at the christening, also in attendance were Dunham's Kilo Company commander, Major Trent Gibson, as well as Sergeant Bill Hampton and Corporal Kelly Miller, whose lives he saved, and retired General Hagee. A piece of Dunham's helmet is encased in the mast. The Jason Dunham was commissioned on November 13, 2010. The ship's galley, named "Jason's Dugout", is decorated with memorabilia from Dunham's favorite baseball team, the New York Yankees.

Other namesakes

The Marine Corps Security Force Barracks at Naval Submarine Base Kings Bay was renamed the Cpl Jason Dunham Barracks in late June 2007.

The Cpl Dunham room is located at the Corporals Course at Marine Corps Air Station Beaufort, South Carolina.

A Crucible warrior's station at the Marine Corps Recruit Depot Parris Island, South Carolina and Marine Corps Recruit Depot San Diego, California was named in his honor. When recruits arrive at this station, they will read Cpl Dunham's Medal of Honor citation, and then perform ground-fighting techniques reflecting those Dunham used to defend himself and his fellow Marines leading to his nomination for the Medal of Honor.

A bill to rename the Scio post office, located at 4422 West Sciota Street in Scio, New York, as the Corporal Jason L. Dunham Post Office was submitted to the House of Representatives in December 2005 by Congressman Randy Kuhl. The bill was immediately passed in the House with support from all New York delegation members. With the support of both New York Senators Chuck Schumer and Hillary Clinton, the bill passed the Senate. On March 14, 2006, President Bush signed the bill. He also met with Dunham's family, who gave him a copy of The Gift of Valor.

See also

List of Medal of Honor recipients
Rafael Peralta – another US marine who died while shielding others from a grenade

References
Specific

General

External links

1981 births
2004 deaths
Deaths by hand grenade
People from Allegany County, New York
United States Marine Corps non-commissioned officers
United States Marine Corps Medal of Honor recipients
American military personnel killed in the Iraq War
Iraq War recipients of the Medal of Honor
United States Marine Corps personnel of the Iraq War